The Sudanese Communist Party (abbr. SCP) is a communist party in Sudan. Founded in 1946, it was a major force in Sudanese politics in the early post-independence years, and was one of the two most influential communist parties in the Arab world, the other being the Iraqi Communist Party.

In 1971, President Gaafar Nimeiry launched a wave of repression against the party after a failed coup implicated the involvement of a number of communist military officers. The party's most prominent figuresAbdel Khaliq Mahjub, Joseph Garang, Alshafi Ahmed Elshikh, Babkir Elnour and Hashem al Attawere executed, and the party was officially banned. The party resurfaced after Nimeiry was overthrown in 1985.

The SCP opposed army colonel Omar al-Bashir's 1989 coup and his subsequent 25-year-long tenure as Sudan's head of state. The party is currently opposed to Abdel Fattah al-Burhan's Transitional Military Council and the measures enacted after the 2019 coup.

History

Foundation and growth 
The Sudanese Movement for National Liberation (also known by its Arabic acronym HASTU) was founded in 1946, through the merger of two Sudanese communist groups – the Omdurman group belonging to Henri Curiel's Egyptian Movement for National Liberation and a group in Khartoum which had been organized by Herbert Storey, a British soldier and member of the Communist Party of Great Britain. During the 1940s and 1950s the party became popular amongst students, and it helped establish the Students' Congress in 1949. The party originally worked largely through different front organisations such as the Anti-Imperialist Front, through which it contested the 1953 parliamentary election. At the third conference of the Sudanese Movement for National Liberation, held in February 1956, the party changed its name to the Sudanese Communist Party. A hundred party members attended the conference, which elected a 31-member central committee.

The party joined other groups in opposition to the government of Ibrahim Abboud, and played a key role in toppling the government in the 1964 October Revolution, joining the subsequent transitional government.

The party contested two elections in the 1960s and came into conflict with the Umma Party and National Unionist Party-led government. Nevertheless, the party went on to win 8 seats in the 1965 election, with Ahmad Sulayman being elected from a territorial constituency, and Abdel Khaliq Mahjub being elected as an independent. Another member of the party, Fatima Ahmed Ibrahim, was the first woman elected to the Sudanese parliament.

The Sino-Soviet split caused a split within the party which lasted from late 1964 to early 1965. Pro-Chinese members were either expelled or chose to leave voluntarily to form the Sudanese Communist Party – Revolutionary Leadership.

From 1965 to 1967, a number of parties attempted to outlaw the SCP from partaking in parliamentary elections. Some members advocated the establishment of an ideologically broader Socialist Party of the Sudan, which lasted from 1967 to 1969. Other members advocated operating underground.

Nimeiry government and 1971 coup 
The military overthrew the Sudanese government on 25 May 1969 in a coup d'état led by Gaafar Nimeiry. The SCP gained influence in the new administration, and SCP policies, such as those pertaining to regional autonomy for the south, were adopted by the Nimeiry government. Joseph Garang, an SCP member, was made the Government Minister of Southern Affairs. The SCP was supportive of negotiations which led to the Addis Ababa Agreement of 1972.

On 19 July 1971, A group of army officers led by Major Hashem al-Atta launched a coup d'état against the Nimeiry government. However, Nimeiry loyalists retook the capital Khartoum three days later, freed Nimeiry, and restored his government. As many of the conspirators were members of the SCP, Nimeiry blamed the party for the coup and executed several of its leaders, including Mahjub and Garang.

The failed coup had its roots in historical ideological differences within the party, between the pro-Soviet faction and the nationalist faction. The nationalists, such as Ahmad Sulayman and Farouk Abu Issa, wished to cooperate with the Nimeiry government. The pro-Soviet faction, led by Mahjub, was less supportive and opposed the 1969 coup by Nimeiry.

Post-Nimeiry 
On 6 April 1985, Abdel Rahman Swar al-Dahab launched a coup d'état and overthrew Nimeiry. In this new climate the SCP, now led by Muhammad Ibrahim Nugud, resumed its former above-ground activities and took part in the 1986 election, winning 3 seats, and returning Fatima Ahmed Ibrahim to the National Assembly.

Following the 1989 Sudanese coup d'état, however, the SCP was again repressed, with the party being banned and its leaders being arrested.

Recent developments 
In a 2007 interview, then general secretary of the SCP Muhammad Ibrahim Nugud claimed that the party enjoyed support from a wide section of Sudanese society, including "workers, farmers, students, women's groups, minority groups, in the Nuba Mountains, in the south, and in Darfur". Human rights activist Suleman Hamid El Haj was most recently the assistant secretary and spokesman for the party. After the independence of South Sudan in 2011, the southern branch of the party split to form the Communist Party of South Sudan.

In 2008, the SCP and the South African Communist Party jointly launched the African Left Network to facilitate greater cooperation amongst African communist parties.

Nugud died in London, the United Kingdom, on 22 March 2012. By then he had served as the party's general secretary for over four decades. He was succeeded by Muhammad Mukhtar al-Khatib.

Ideology

Historical 
During the Cold War the party developed two main factions, an Orthodox Marxist–Leninist and pro-Soviet faction led by Abdel Khaliq Mahjub, and a nationalist faction led by Ahmad Sulayman and Farouk Abu Issa, which emphasized a more localized Sudanese interpretation of Marxism.

The party previously supported the policies and positions of the Sudan People's Liberation Movement (SPLM) in the early 1990s.

Current 
The SCP advocates a return to democratic rule in Sudan and opposed the secession of southern Sudan. The freer political climate following the signing of the Comprehensive Peace Agreement has allowed the party to be more active in the country. Party leader Muhammad Ibrahim Nugud came out of two decades of hiding in 2008. Party members suffering during the decades of NIF rule had pleaded with him to be more active but Nugud feared arrest. Nugud visited Juba on 28 November 2008 at the invitation of southern Sudanese communists. The trip was aimed at "bolstering the activities of the SCP in southern Sudan". He was received by SPLM Deputy Secretary General Ann Itto.

The party participated in the 2018–2019 protests and is opposed to the measures enacted by the Transitional Military Council in the aftermath of the 2019 coup d'état.

Party leaders

General Secretary 
 Abdel Khaliq Mahjub (February 1949 – 28 July 1971)
 Muhammad Ibrahim Nugud ( July 1971 – 22 March 2012)
 Muhammad Mukhtar al-Khatib ( March 2012 – present)

Election results 

 Notes

See also
 Egyptian Communist Party
 Communist Party of South Sudan

References

Citations

Sources

Books

Journal articles

News and magazine articles

Interviews

Websites

Further reading

External links 
 

1946 establishments in Sudan
Communist parties in Sudan
Formerly banned communist parties
International Meeting of Communist and Workers Parties
Communist Party
Political parties established in 1946
Political parties in Sudan
Sudanese democracy movements